Acrochordonichthys mahakamensis is a species of catfish of the family Akysidae. A detailed discussion of this species's relationship with the other members of its genus can be found on Acrochordonichthys.

References 

Akysidae
Freshwater fish of Borneo
Fish described in 2001